Albian Muzaqi Mustafa (born 24 November 1994) is a Germany-born Dutch professional footballer of Albanian descent who plays as a forward, most recently for Helmond Sport.

Club career 
Muzaqi spent his youth career with CRC Groningen, FC Groningen and PSV Eindhoven. In 2013, he joined Belgian side KRC Genk on a free transfer. Muzaqi made his debut for KRC Genk at 12 December 2013 in a UEFA Europa League fixture against FC Thun. He replaced Jelle Vossen in the second half, who scored the only goal of the game.

After spending the 2017–18 season without a club, he signed with the Eerste Divisie club Helmond Sport on 31 August 2018.

References

External links
 

1994 births
Living people
Dutch footballers
Dutch people of Albanian descent
PSV Eindhoven players
FC Eindhoven players
K.R.C. Genk players
Cercle Brugge K.S.V. players
Helmond Sport players
Belgian Pro League players
Challenger Pro League players
Eerste Divisie players
Dutch expatriate footballers
Expatriate footballers in Belgium
Association football forwards
People from Ellwangen
Sportspeople from Stuttgart (region)
Footballers from Baden-Württemberg